OCSO is the abbreviation for the Order of Cistercians of the Strict Observance (a.k.a. 'Trappists'), a French religious order.

OCSO may also refer to:

 Office of the Chief of Space Operations, a US government agency
 Orange County Sheriff's Office (Florida), a US law enforcement agency